The Palais de Chaillot is a building at the top of the  in the Trocadéro area in the 16th arrondissement of Paris, France.

For the Exposition Internationale of 1937, the old 1878 Palais du Trocadéro was partly demolished and partly rebuilt to create the Palais de Chaillot. It was designed in classicising "moderne" style by architects Louis-Hippolyte Boileau, Jacques Carlu and Léon Azéma. The Palais consists of two separate wings shaped to form a wide arc, which are those of the former building with new taller portions built in front. The pair of larger central pavilions are also those of the former palais, encapsulated in new construction. The large central hall and towers of the old palais were demolished, leaving only the basement, with a wide esplanade created on top, establishing an open view from the place du Trocadéro to the Eiffel Tower and beyond.

The buildings are decorated with quotations by Paul Valéry, and sculptural groups at the attic level by Raymond Delamarre, Carlo Sarrabezolles and Alfred Bottiau. The eight gilded figures on the terrace of the Rights of Man are attributed to the sculptors Alexandre Descatoire, Marcel Gimond, Jean Paris dit Pryas, Paul Cornet, Lucien Brasseur, Robert Couturier, Paul Niclausse and Félix-Alexandre Desruelles.

The buildings now house a number of museums:
 the Musée national de la Marine (naval museum) and the Musée de l'Homme (prehistory and anthropology) in the southern (Passy) wing,
 the Cité de l'Architecture et du Patrimoine, including the Musée national des Monuments Français, in the eastern (Paris) wing, from which one also enters the Théâtre national de Chaillot, a theatre below the esplanade.

It was on the front terrace of the palace that Adolf Hitler was pictured during his short tour of the city in 1940, with the Eiffel Tower in the background. This became an iconic image of the Second World War. On VE Day, 8 May 1945, the U.S. Army in Paris celebrated their victory on the same spot.  Over 2800 soldiers, sailors and airmen listened to the victory speech to the troops by President Harry S. Truman, and then an address by the ranking officer in Paris, Lt. Gen John C. H. Lee, commanding general of the Com-Z logistics operations of the U.S. Army in Europe since May 1942.  In 1948, the Palais de Chaillot hosted the third United Nations General Assembly, and, in 1951, the sixth General Assembly. It is in the Palais de Chaillot that the United Nations General Assembly adopted the Universal Declaration of Human Rights on 10 December 1948. This event is now commemorated by a stone, and the esplanade is known as the esplanade des droits de l'homme ("esplanade of human rights"). The Palais de Chaillot was also the initial headquarters of NATO, while the "Palais de l'OTAN" (now Université Paris Dauphine) was being built.

References

External links

 
 Images of the Palais de Chaillot
 The Palais de Chaillot while it was being renovated

Art Deco architecture in France
Buildings and structures in the 16th arrondissement of Paris
Modernist architecture in France
Terminating vistas in Paris
World's fair architecture in Paris
Buildings and structures completed in 1937
Exposition Internationale des Arts et Techniques dans la Vie Moderne
20th-century architecture in France